A drop tower or big drop is a type of amusement ride incorporating a central structure or tower. Drop towers vary in height, passenger capacity, lift type, and brake type. Many are custom-made, although there are some mass-produced designs. The most widely sold drop towers have been manufactured by Intamin and S&S Sansei, however Larson International and Funtime have their own drop tower models available as well. Riders initially experience free fall, followed by rapid heavy deceleration.

With most drop towers, a gondola carrying riders is lifted to the top of a large vertical structure, then released to free-fall down the tower. Brakes slow the gondola as it approaches the bottom of the ride. Some designs expand on this concept with features such as rotating gondolas, or several bounces before coming to rest.

Drop tower designs
Mass-produced tower rides include:
 Double shot (air-powered blast up twice)
 Space shot (air-powered blast up)
 Super shot (drop down ride slowed by magnetic or air-power)
 Turbo drop (drop down ride slowed by air-power)

Tallest drop towers

Other notable examples

 Space Probe located at Wonderland Sydney in Australia
 Apocalypse at Drayton Manor
 Detonator: Bombs Away at Thorpe Park
 Ice Blast at Pleasure Beach Blackpool
 AtmosFEAR at Morey's Piers, Wildwood, New Jersey
 The Twilight Zone Tower of Terror at multiple Disney parks worldwide.
 Acrophobia at Six Flags Over Georgia
 Guardians of the Galaxy - Mission: Breakout! at Disney California Adventure Park
 Giant Drop at Six Flags Great America

Injuries and accidents

 In 1999, a 12-year-old boy fell to his death on Drop Zone: Stunt Tower(Drop Tower) at Paramount's Great America(California's Great America) after slipping from the ride's restraints, which were still locked at the end of the ride.
 On June 21, 2007 (park operating as Six Flags Kentucky Kingdom), a 13-year-old girl from Louisville, Kentucky had both feet cut off above the ankle when one of the ride's cables snapped during operation. Following the incident, all Intamin towers were temporarily closed and the Carowinds model was found to have stretched cables.
 On February 24, 2012, 14-year-old Gabriella Yukari Nichimura died in an accident at Hopi Hari, Vinhedo, São Paulo State, Brazil. She fell from the drop tower ride "La Tour Eiffel" suffering cranial trauma and died on the way to the hospital. Initial investigations suggested the possibility of mechanical failure in the restraint latch.
 On the evening of September 5, 2021, 6-year-old Wongel Estifanos died on the Haunted Mine Drop ride after being separated from her seat and falling  to her death. It has been determined that the girl was actually sitting on top of her seatbelt rather than the seatbelt being tight on her lap. A forensic pathologist identified the cause of death as blunt-force trauma. The official report by the Colorado Division of Oil and Public Safety blamed a lack of procedures and inadequate training of two ride operators to ensure that Estifanos was properly buckled in. Before the accident, the ride had had four annual safety inspections per Colorado Amusement Rides and Devices Regulations (7 CCR 1101-12) and was certified to have corrected any issues. Following the incident the park temporarily closed. Colorado Senate Bill 03-253 allows parents to release their minor’s rights to sue for negligence.
 On the evening of March 24, 2022, 14-year-old Tyre Sampson from Missouri fell to his death from the world's tallest drop tower ride, the Orlando FreeFall drop tower at ICON Park in Florida. The brand new attraction had been open for only three months at the time of the accident. On April 18, 2022, it was discovered that the safety sensors of two seats were intentionally modified to generate a "go" signal for larger and therefore unsafe harness-to-seat gaps, presumably to accommodate larger riders, a condition that ultimately led to Tyre's death, since he slipped through that gap toward the end of the drop when the ride slowed down. This is only one major factor among others that may have caused the tragedy, including the fact that Tyre weighed 320 pounds (144 kg) and the ride manual stipulates a weight limit of 287 pounds (130 kg). On October 6, 2022, it was announced that the Orlando Free Fall tower would be dismantled. The owner plans to have the demolition finished by the anniversary of the victim’s death.
 On September 5, 2022, a drop tower in India failed to slow down then crashed to ground, injuring 16.

See also
 Freefall

References

 
Towers